Dwight Herbert Green (January 9, 1897 – February 20, 1958) was an American politician who served as the 30th Governor of the US state of Illinois, serving from 1941 to 1949.

From childhood to early adulthood 
Green was born in Ligonier, Noble County, Indiana, son of Harry Green and Minnie (Gerber) Green.  On June 29, 1926, he married Mabel Victoria Kingston. He served in the U.S. Army during World War I. Dwight and Mabel's children were Gloria and Nancy—they attended Springfield High School in LaPorte County. Nancy married Dr. James Gilbert and they had two daughters, Susie and Gloria. Gloria married Dr. Warren McPherson and they had two children, Scott and Victoria. Nancy Green Gilbert died in 2019. Gloria Green McPherson died in 1985.

Green attended Wabash College in Crawfordsville, Indiana, where he was a member of the Alpha-Pi Chapter of the Kappa Sigma Fraternity. He attended law school at the University of Chicago, practiced law, and served as United States Attorney for the Northern District of Illinois in 1931–35.  It would be Green's primary responsibility to help fight the organized crime operations—such as Al Capone's gang—which virtually ruled Chicago and much of the state in the 1930s.  The government team prosecuting Al Capone for Tax Evasion consisted of U.S. Attorney George E. Q. Johnson, and his prosecutors Dwight H. Green, Samuel Clawson, Jacob Grossman and William Froelich. In 1939, he was the unsuccessful Republican candidate for Mayor of Chicago.

Governor of Illinois 

In 1940, a backlash against the New Deal and the U.S. Democratic Party had begun to affect Illinois and many other states, especially in the Midwest.  The Republican Green, with his record as a prosecutor and established opposition to the big-city Chicago political machine, was elected governor of Illinois in the 1940 Illinois gubernatorial election. He was inaugurated on January 13, 1941.

At the end of the same year, Pearl Harbor thrust Governor Green into the job of leading one of the largest U.S. state governments during World War II.  He won widespread support during the war and was reelected in 1944 to serve a second full term.

The coming of peace in 1945 created new challenges for America's big cities and state governments.  In particular, there was a sharp shortage of housing for returning veterans and their families, as little had been built during the war or the Great Depression.

The Chicago Democratic party slated an intellectual lawyer, Adlai Stevenson, to oppose Green for a third term in office.  In a surprising upset, Stevenson defeated Green in November 1948, ending Green's political career; the defeat was in part owing to his negligence in preventing the deaths of 111 miners in the Centralia mine disaster.

Later years 
Governor Green returned to private life after his 1948 defeat.  He died February 20, 1958, and was buried at Rosehill Cemetery in Chicago.

References 

|-

|-

|-

1897 births
1958 deaths
20th-century American politicians
United States Army personnel of World War I
American prosecutors
Burials at Rosehill Cemetery
Republican Party governors of Illinois
People from Ligonier, Indiana
Politicians from Chicago
Military personnel from Indiana
United States Attorneys for the Northern District of Illinois
Candidates in the 1948 United States presidential election
Wabash College alumni